PG Marine Group - Ing Per Gjerdrum AS is a family firm that was founded in 1982 by Per Gjerdrum, owned by the families Gjerdrum, Norum, Eide. The firm started as a pump supplier for the Norwegian maritime market. It has evolved to a designer and supplier of cargo handling systems for offshore supply vessels, and has a significant export to Brazil, China, Singapore and Europe – where PG is dominant market leaders.

The firm, together with the NLI Group, was awarded in 2007 a contract worth NOK 50 million kronerfor building a chemical injection modular to the Nye Gjøa-platform. The same year the firm obtained a contract worth NOK 100 million for delivering a loading handling system PG-MACS to the German Harms Offshore.

References

External links

Company sites
Pergjerdrum.no
PG-MACS.com
PG-Hydraulics.com
PG-Construction.no

Engineering companies of Norway
Companies established in 1982
1982 establishments in Norway